Markus Perez Echeimberg (born June 22, 1990) is a Brazilian mixed martial artist currently competing in the Middleweight division. A professional since 2013, he has also fought for Ultimate Fighting Championship (UFC), Jungle Fight and the Legacy Fighting Alliance, where he is the former Middleweight Champion.

Background
Echeimberg started training Kung-Fu style Eagle Claw in 2008 to impersonate Bruce Lee and later transitioned to mixed martial arts (MMA) after his brother took him to a jiu-jitsu class. Prior competing full-time in MMA, Markus worked as an information technology engineer at technology school and he was also a freelanced software developer, and he quit his job and college to teach Muay Thai and competed in Brazilian jiu-jitsu to make a living so he could pursue MMA full-time. After made it to the preliminary round of The Ultimate Fighter: Brazil 3, he gained his parents support as they realized his seriousness of his MMA career choice.

Mixed martial arts career

Early career
Echeimberg fought in the Brazilian-based promotions and amassed of a record of 9–0 prior joining UFC after winning the Legacy Fighting Alliance (LFA) middleweight championship.

The Ultimate Fighter: Brazil
Echeimberg was chosen to be a fighter on The Ultimate Fighter: Brazil 3.  In the opening elimination round, he lost to Guilherme Vasconcelos via submission (rear-naked choke) in the first round.

Ultimate Fighting Championship
Less than two months after winning the vacant Legacy Fighting Alliance (LFA), Echeimberg was signed by UFC. Perez made his UFC debut on December 9, 2017 against Eryk Anders, replacing John Phillips, at UFC Fight Night 123.  He lost the fight via unanimous decision.

His next fight came on May 12, 2018 against James Bochnovic at UFC 224.  He won the fight via a submission.

On August 25, 2018, Perez faced Andrew Sanchez, replacing Antonio Braga Neto, at UFC Fight Night 135.  He lost the fight via unanimous decision.

Perez faced promotional newcomer Anthony Hernandez on February 2, 2019 at UFC on ESPN+ 2. He won the fight via technical submission in the second round.

Perez was scheduled to face promotional newcomer Deron Winn  on June 22, 2019 at UFC on ESPN+ 11 However, it was reported on May 9, 2019 that Perez pulled out of the fight due to injury.

Perez was scheduled to face Jack Marshman on November 16, 2019 at UFC on ESPN+ 22. However, Marshman was pulled from the event for undisclosed reason and he was replaced by Wellington Turman.

Perez faced Wellington Turman on November 16, 2019 at UFC Fight Night: Błachowicz vs. Jacaré. He lost the fight via unanimous decision.

Perez was scheduled to face Alessio Di Chirico, replacing Abu Azaitar, on April 11, 2020 at UFC Fight Night: Overeem vs. Harris. Due to the COVID-19 pandemic, the event was eventually cancelled.

Perez was scheduled  to face Eric Spicely on August 1, 2020 at UFC Fight Night: Brunson vs. Shahbazyan. However, Spicely was removed from the fight on the day of the event's weigh-in for health issues related to his weight cut. Perez will now face Charles Ontiveros

Perez was scheduled to face Rodolfo Vieira on  October 11, 2020 at UFC Fight Night 179, However on September 21, Vieira pulled out due to undisclosed reasons, and he was replaced by promotional newcomer Dricus du Plessis. Perez lost  the fight via knockout in round one.

Perez faced Dalcha Lungiambula, replacing Isi Fitikefu, on January 20, 2021 at UFC on ESPN 20. He lost the fight via unanimous decision.

On February 4, 2021, it was announced that Perez was released from his UFC contract.

Post-UFC career
Perez was scheduled to face Shane O'Shea at Titan FC 68 on March 26, 2021. However, the bout was cancelled due to an unknown reason.

Perez was scheduled to face Christiano Frohlich on July 2, 2021 at LFA 110. The bout was scratched days before the event for unknown reasons.

Perez faced Zac Pauga on October 17, 2021 at Cage Warriors 130. He lost the bout via unanimous decision.

Perez faced Filipe Moitinho on December 19, 2021 at Thunder Fight 33. He won the bout via guillotine submission 33 seconds into the bout.

Championships and achievements
Legacy Fighting Alliance
 Legacy Fighting Alliance Middleweight Champion (One time) 
Thunder Fight
 Thunder Fight Middleweight Champion

Personal life
Echeimberg's moniker "Maluko", an adaptation of the word "maluco", which means "crazy" in Portuguese, was given by his teammates, who thought he was crazy after he asked his coach if he could wear Kung Fu pants and shoes when he train boxing to impersonate Bruce Lee.

Mixed martial arts record

|-
|Win
|align=center| 14–6
|Chase Gamble
|Submission (rear-naked choke)
|AFL: Invincible 2023
|
|align=center|1
|align=center|2:10
|Hollywood, Florida, United States
|
|-
|Win
|align=center| 13–6
|Filipe Moitinho
|Submission (guillotine choke)
|Thunder Fight 33
|
|align=center|1
|align=center|0:33
|São Bernardo do Campo, Brazil
|
|-
|Loss
|align=center|12–6
|Zac Pauga
|Decision (unanimous)
|Cage Warriors 130
|
|align=center|3
|align=center|5:00
|San Diego, California, United States
|
|-
|Loss
|align=center|12–5
|Dalcha Lungiambula
| Decision (unanimous)
| UFC on ESPN: Magny vs. Chiesa
| 
| align=center|3
| align=center|5:00
|Abu Dhabi, United Arab Emirates
|
|-
|Loss
|align=center|12–4
|Dricus du Plessis
|KO (punches)
|UFC Fight Night: Moraes vs. Sandhagen 
|
|align=center|1
|align=center|3:22
|Abu Dhabi, United Arab Emirates
|
|-
|Loss
|align=center|12–3
|Wellington Turman
|Decision (unanimous)
|UFC Fight Night: Błachowicz vs. Jacaré 
|
|align=center|3
|align=center|5:00
|São Paulo, Brazil
|
|-
| Win
| align=center| 12–2
|Anthony Hernandez
|Technical Submission (anaconda choke)
|UFC Fight Night: Assunção vs. Moraes 2
|
|align=center|2
|align=center|1:07
|Fortaleza, Brazil 
|
|-
| Loss
| align=center| 11–2
| Andrew Sanchez
| Decision (unanimous)
| UFC Fight Night: Gaethje vs. Vick
| 
| align=center| 3
| align=center| 5:00
| Lincoln, Nebraska, United States
|
|-
| Win
| align=center| 11–1
| James Bochnovic
| Submission (rear-naked choke)
| UFC 224
| 
| align=center| 1
| align=center| 4:28
| Rio de Janeiro, Brazil
|
|-
| Loss
| align=center| 10–1
| Eryk Anders
| Decision (unanimous)
| UFC Fight Night: Swanson vs. Ortega
| 
| align=center| 3
| align=center| 5:00
| Fresno, California, United States
|
|-
| Win
| align=center| 10–0
| Ian Heinisch
| Submission (arm-triangle choke)
| LFA 22
| 
| align=center| 1
| align=center| 2:14
| Broomfield, Colorado, United States
|
|-
| Win
| align=center| 9–0
| Ildemar Alcântara
| Decision (unanimous)
| Arzalet Fighting Globe Championship 1
| 
| align=center| 1
| align=center| 2:14
| São Paulo, Brazil
|
|-
| Win
| align=center| 8–0
| Paulo Thiago
| Decision (unanimous)
| Thunder Fight 7 
| 
| align=center| 5
| align=center| 5:00
| São Paulo, Brazil
|
|-
| Win
| align=center| 7–0
| Fabricio Almeida Gonçalves
| KO (spinning back elbow)
| Aspera Fighting Championship 38 
| 
| align=center| 3
| align=center| 0:34
| São Paulo, Brazil
|
|-
| Win
| align=center| 6–0
| Anderson Melo
| TKO (punches)
| Battle of Kings
| 
| align=center| 1
| align=center| 1:27
| Ilhéus, Brazil
|
|-
| Win
| align=center| 5–0
| Rafael Silva
| Submission (rear-naked choke)
| Thunder Fight 2
| 
| align=center| 1
| align=center| 2:42
| São Paulo, Brazil
|
|-
| Win
| align=center| 4–0
| Giovani Colombo
| Submission (arm-triangle choke)
| Interior Fight: Fight For Your Destiny
| 
| align=center| 1
| align=center| 0:30
| São Paulo, Brazil
|
|-
| Win
| align=center| 3–0
| Bruno da Silva
| Submission (kneebar)
| Jungle Fight 58
| 
| align=center| 1
| align=center| 3:17
| São Paulo, Brazil
| 
|-
| Win
| align=center| 2–0
| Marcelo Matias
| Decision (unanimous)
| RSF 5 
| 
| align=center| 3
| align=center| 5:00
| São Paulo, Brazil
|
|-
| Win
| align=center| 1–0
| Rene Pessoa
| TKO (punches)
| Pegada Magazine: Desafio Revista Pegada
| 
| align=center| 2
| align=center| 3:29
| São Paulo, Brazil
|
|-

See also
 List of male mixed martial artists

References

External links
 
 

Living people
1990 births
Brazilian male mixed martial artists
Middleweight mixed martial artists
Mixed martial artists utilizing Muay Thai
Mixed martial artists utilizing Brazilian jiu-jitsu
Brazilian practitioners of Brazilian jiu-jitsu
Brazilian Muay Thai practitioners
Sportspeople from São Paulo
Ultimate Fighting Championship male fighters